Vardavard-e Sofla (also Romanized as Vardāvard-e Soflá; also known as Var Dāvad-e Soflá, Vardāvar-e Pā’īn, and Vardood Sofla) is a village in Khorram Rud Rural District, in the Central District of Tuyserkan County, Hamadan Province, Iran. At the 2006 census, its population was 185, in 54 families.

References 

Populated places in Tuyserkan County